Live in Warsaw may refer to:

 Live in Warsaw (McCoy Tyner album)
 Live in Warsaw (IAMX album)
 Live in Warsaw, Poland, an album by King Crimson